The Egypt national football team has been competing in international matches since 1920, as such the results are listed on multiple pages:

Egypt national football team results (1920–59)
Egypt national football team results (1960–79)
Egypt national football team results (1980–99)
Egypt national football team results (2000–19)
Egypt national football team results (2020–39)
Egypt national football team results (unofficial matches)

See also
 Egypt national football team